Martin Heron is a sculptor from Northern Ireland working with steel. He is a member of the Royal British Society of Sculptors and The London Group. His art is found outdoors in public places in Northern Ireland. His sculpture "For the Love of Emer" was Armagh City's first commission public artwork. It is a depiction of legendary Irish hero Cú Chulainn balancing on a 20-foot pole. His piece, Handstanding, is outside a public school in Ravenswood, Ipswich.  Another sculpture group carved from tree trunks is found along the Irwell Sculpture Trail.

Notable commissions
 Where Dreams Go, Strabane District Council, County Tyrone, Northern Ireland, 2007–08
 Handstanding, Ipswich Borough Council, Ravenswood, Ipswich, 2006
 Ascent Terrifique & Reach stainless steel sculptures, Home Zone Project, Hull City Council, Albany Street Kingston upon Hull, 2005
 Afloat, stainless steel sculpture, Groundwork Stoke-on-Trent, Westport Lake, Tunstall, Stoke-on-Trent, 2005
 Chariot stainless steel sculpture, commissioned for ASDA, ASDA superstore, Thurmaston, Leicestershire, 2003

References

Axis - Martin Heron

Living people
Sculptors from Northern Ireland
Year of birth missing (living people)